Landmark Records was an American jazz record company and label founded in 1985 by Orrin Keepnews. Landmark's releases included music by Donald Byrd, Jack DeJohnette, Jimmy Heath, Vincent Herring, Bobby Hutcherson, Mulgrew Miller, Buddy Montgomery, and reissues of Cannonball Adderley.

Its catalogue also included two jazz albums by the Kronos Quartet in which they covered the work of Bill Evans and Thelonious Monk. Landmark was bought by Muse Records in 1993. Muse and Landmark were acquired by 32 Jazz in 1996. In 2003, Savoy Jazz (which had become a subsidiary of Nippon Columbia) acquired the rights to the Muse and Landmark catalogs from 32 Jazz.

Discography

1300 Series
LCD	ARTIST	TITLE
1301	Cannonball Adderley – Them Dirty Blues
1302	Cannonball Adderley – Cannonball's Bossa Nova
1303       Cannonball Adderley – Jazz Workshop Revisited
1304	Cannonball Adderley – Cannonball Adderley and the Poll-Winners
1305	Cannonball Adderley – The Cannonball Adderley Quintet at the Lighthouse
1306	Cannonball Adderley – Cannonball Takes Charge
1307	Cannonball Adderley – Cannonball in Europe!
(1301–1307 were released under The Cannonball Addderley Collection Volumes 1–7 and consisted of the Riverside Records masters (originally produced by Orrin Keepnews) that Adderley took with him when he moved to Capitol Records after Riverside Records went bankrupt. This explains why these were never released as part of the "Original Jazz Classics" series from Fantasy Records, the subsequent owner of the Riverside Records catalog–in addition, V.7 was previously unreleased in the US).
1308	Helen Merrill & Dick Katz – A Shade of Difference (reissue)
1309	Eddie "Cleanhead" Vinson and Cannonball Adderley – Cleanhead & Cannonball
1310	Bobby Hutcherson – Landmarks (compilation)

500/1500 Series

See also 
 List of record labels

References

American record labels
Jazz record labels
Record labels established in 1985
 
 
American companies established in 1985